Carlisle Historic District is a national historic district located at Carlisle, Cumberland County, Pennsylvania.  The district includes 1,011 contributing buildings, 1 contributing site, and 1 contributing object in the central business district and surrounding residential areas of Carlisle. Most of the contributing buildings date to the mid- to late-19th century, with a few dated to the 18th century.  Residential areas include notable examples of the Late Victorian and Federal styles.  Notable non-residential buildings include the Cumberland County Courthouse (1845-1846), St. John's Episcopal Church (c. 1890), Cumberland County Prison (c. 1865), First Lutheran Church (c. 1900), Tavern (c. 1810), First Presbyterian Church (c. 1760), Theatre (c. 1930), Fire House (c. 1890), Grace United Methodist Church (c. 1829), and St. Patrick's Church (c. 1892).

The district was added to the National Register of Historic Places in 1979.

References

Federal architecture in Pennsylvania
Historic districts in Cumberland County, Pennsylvania
Historic districts on the National Register of Historic Places in Pennsylvania
National Register of Historic Places in Cumberland County, Pennsylvania